George Pierce Baker (November 1, 1903 – January 25, 1995) was the fifth dean of the Harvard Business School.

Baker earned his bachelor's, master's and Ph.D. all from Harvard University.  He began teaching at Harvard in 1928 and joined Harvard Business School faculty in 1936.  He left Harvard and joined the Civil Aeronautics Board in 1942.  In 1945 he became the director of the Office of Transport and Communications Policy for the United States Department of State.  From 1946 to 1956 he served as the United States member of the United Nations Transport and Communications Commission.  In 1946 Baker also returned to Harvard Business School as the James J. Hill Professor of Transportation.

References

Archives and records
George P. Baker papers at Baker Library Special Collections, Harvard Business School

1903 births
1995 deaths
Harvard College alumni
Harvard Business School faculty
Business school deans
American university and college faculty deans
20th-century American academics